Moura Atlético Clube is a Portuguese club founded in 1942 and located in Moura, Beja.

History
The club was founded on January 17, 1942 and its current president is Hélder Feliciano. Since the 2013–2014 season, the football team competes in Campeonato de Portugal, the third-level of Portuguese football. Its stadium was funded in 2000 and it has the capacity for 6,000 spectators.

References

Football clubs in Portugal